Silva Magnet High School is a health-focused magnet high school within the El Paso Independent School District in El Paso, Texas.

It is named after lifelong El Pasoan Maxine L. Silva, who once represented the area in which the school is located on the El Paso Independent School District board of trustees.

Campus
Silva Magnet High School is a three-story, one-building campus located on the grounds of Jefferson High School in south central El Paso.

The University Medical Center (formerly Thomason General Hospital) and the Texas Tech University Health Science Center are located directly across the street from Silva, providing easy and convenient access for student learning.  Students from middle schools throughout the county apply for admission to the high school during 8th grade, leading to a diverse body of students from different cultural and socioeconomic backgrounds from throughout El Paso County.

School within a School
Ms. Charmine Deremeir was the first administrator (1993-1994) of the El Paso Magnet High School for the Health Care Professions, now known as the Maxine Silva Magnet High School for the Health Care Professions.  She was instrumental in assuring the placement of the Health Magnet High School as well as having worked closely with the first group of students (Class of 1997) and their parents in determining what needed to be done to ensure that Silva would be seen as a model school.

Mr. Ed Jones, the second administrator of Silva Magnet High School, used the phrase "school within a school" to describe Silva's situation.  Students from Silva may attend some classes at Jefferson High School, which is located on the same campus, and participate in athletics and other extracurricular activities (e.g., orchestra, band) on Jefferson teams.  However, the two are separated by different curricula and the availability of Health Science Technology (HST) courses for Silva students. These include Anatomy & Physiology, LVN training, Pharmacy Technician training, and many other courses.

Alumni
As a medical magnet high school, numerous alumni have gone on to careers as physicians, pharmacists, and in nursing.

Clubs

-Student Council

-Academic Decathlon

-Speech and Debate

-National Honor Society

-HOSA

HOSA
Silva students take particular pride in their participation in Health Occupations Students of America (HOSA) competitions. It is the largest organization in the school.  Silva students have participated and placed in HOSA competitions and conferences in regional (Area 4), state and national levels.

Silva also had many students serve as officers, at the Area, State, and National level.

School prestige
Among El Paso schools (private and public), Silva Magnet High School has consistently ranked academically at or near the top in various categories. In 2006, Newsweek magazine ranked Silva Magnet High School as one of the top 1000 schools in the U.S., and was rated highest of schools in El Paso on the list.

In 2003, 2011, and 2017 Silva received the Blue Ribbon Schools Award.

References

External links
 
 Silva Library
 Silva listed in Top Texas Schools list

Educational institutions established in 1993
High schools in El Paso, Texas
El Paso Independent School District high schools
Magnet schools in Texas
1993 establishments in Texas